E. vermicularis may refer to:
 Encheliophis vermicularis, a pearlfish species
 Enterobius vermicularis, the human pinworm, a parasitic nematode worm species solely affecting humans

See also
 Vermicularis (disambiguation)